Sisterworld is the fifth studio album by experimental rock trio Liars, released on March 9, 2010. The album was written and recorded in Los Angeles with assistance from Tom Biller. In early November, a link was posted on their official Mypace page directing users to www.thesisterworld.com, where "Scissor", the premiere track from Sisterworld was made available for free download and streaming. An expanded version of the album is being released with a bonus remix disc featuring remixes from Radiohead's Thom Yorke, TV on the Radio's Tunde Adebimpe, Blonde Redhead's Kazu Makino, Deerhunter's Bradford Cox, Melvins and others.
The music video for "Scissor", directed by Andy Bruntel, won the Best Music Video award at the Vimeo Festival + Awards 2011.  In October 2011, NME placed "Scarecrows on a Killer Slant" at number 68 on its list "150 Best Tracks of the Past 15 Years".

Track listing

Deluxe edition bonus remix disc

References

External links
 Album's Official Page
 Spinning Platters Review

2010 albums
Liars (band) albums
Mute Records albums